Prostanthera prunelloides is a species of flowering plant in the family Lamiaceae and is endemic to eastern New South Wales. It is a shrub with four-ridged branches, egg-shaped to round leaves and white or pale mauve flowers.

Description

Taxonomy
Prostanthera prunelloides was formally described in 1810 by Robert Brown in his treatise Prodromus Florae Novae Hollandiae et Insulae Van Diemen.

Distribution and habitat
This mintbush grows in forests and woodland, often near creeks, on the coast and tablelands of New South Wales from Murwillumbah to the Budawang Range.

References

prunelloides
Flora of New South Wales
Lamiales of Australia
Plants described in 1810
Taxa named by Robert Brown (botanist, born 1773)